Abdul Wali Khan Sports Complex also known as Charsadda Sports Complex is located in Charsadda, Khyber Pakhtunkhwa, in Pakistan. It is the 2nd largest sports complex in Khyber Pakhtunkhwa after Qayyum Sports Complex Peshawar. The sport complex has started functioning in 2016 and has been completed at the cost of Rs.490 million.

History and development 
The inauguration of construction work on Abdul Wali Khan sports complex was started in 2012 by ANP President Asfandyar Wali Khan. The sports complex started functioning in 2016. The total cost of project was Rs.490 million.

Sporting facilities 
Abdul Wali Khan Sports Complex currently hold sporting facilities for the following sports.
 Cricket Academy 
 Football Ground
 Hockey Ground
 Swimming pool
 Indoor facilities for Badminton
 Indoor facilities for Squash
 Outdoor facilities for Tennis
 Table Tennis

See also 
 Qayyum Stadium
 Hayatabad Sports Complex
 Mardan Sports Complex Pakistan
 Swat Sports Complex

References

Stadiums in Pakistan
Cricket grounds in Pakistan
Sport in Khyber Pakhtunkhwa
Charsadda District, Pakistan